Francisco Vargas (born 12 November 1963) is a Colombian racewalker. He competed in the men's 20 kilometres walk at the 1984 Summer Olympics.

References

1963 births
Living people
Athletes (track and field) at the 1983 Pan American Games
Athletes (track and field) at the 1984 Summer Olympics
Colombian male racewalkers
Olympic athletes of Colombia
Place of birth missing (living people)
Pan American Games competitors for Colombia
20th-century Colombian people